Valeriy Lozik (born 27 December 1967) is a Ukrainian swimmer. He competed in two events at the 1988 Summer Olympics representing the Soviet Union.

References

External links
 

1967 births
Living people
Ukrainian male swimmers
Olympic swimmers of the Soviet Union
Swimmers at the 1988 Summer Olympics
Sportspeople from Donetsk Oblast
Soviet male swimmers